The year 2019 was the 26th year in the history of the K-1, an international kickboxing event. The year started with K-1: K’Festa 2.

List of events

K-1 World GP 2019: K’FESTA 2

K-1 World GP 2019: K’FESTA 2 was a kickboxing event held by K-1 on March 10, 2019 at the Saitama Super Arena in Saitama, Japan.

Background
The event was headlined by a catchweight, non-title fight between Takeru Segawa and Yodkitsada Yuthachonburi. The four title fights held at K'Festa two saw Yuta Murakoshi and Koya Urabe defend their titles against Hirotaka Urabe and Kenta Hayashi, respectively. Yuta Kubo defended the welterweight title against Yasuhiro Kido, and Sina Karimian made his first title defense against Hisaki Kato.

Fight Card

K-1 World GP 2019: Super Bantamweight World Tournament

K-1 World GP 2019: Super Bantamweight World Tournament was a kickboxing event held by K-1 on June 30, 2019 at the Saitama Super Arena in Saitama, Japan.

Background
During this event a Super Bantamweight Grand Prix was held, featuring the reigning champion Yoshiki Takei, Shuhei Kumura, Samvel Babayan and Masashi Kumura.

In the co-main event, Rukiya Anpo and Kaew Fairtex  fought for the Super Lightweight title.

Fight Card

K-1 World GP 2019: Japan vs World 5 vs 5 & Special Superfight in Osaka	

K-1 World GP 2019: Japan vs World 5 vs 5 & Special Superfight in Osaka	 was a kickboxing event held by K-1 on August 24, 2019 at the EDION Arena Osaka in Osaka, Japan.

Background
The event was headlined by a "Comeback of the Year" match between Koji and Tatsuya Oiwa. In the co-main event Kenta Hayashi fought Deniz Demirkapu.

Fight Card

K-1 World GP 2019 Yokohamatsuri

K-1 World GP 2019 Yokohamatsuri was a kickboxing event held by K-1 on November 24, 2019 at the Yokohama Arena in Yokohama, Japan.

Background
A featherweight Grand Prix was held during this event, which featured Yuki Egawa, Jawsuayai Sor.Dechaphan, Haruma Saikyo, Arthur Meyer, Jorge Varela, Riku Anpo, Hirotaka Urabe and Brandon Spain.

In the co-main event, the K-1 Super Featherweight champion Takeru Segawa fought a non-title bout with Yuta Murakoshi.

Fight Card

K-1 World GP 2019 Japan: ～Women's Flyweight Championship Tournament～

K-1 World GP 2019 Japan: ～Women's Flyweight Championship Tournament～ was a kickboxing event held by K-1 on December 28, 2019 at the Aichi Prefectural Gymnasium in Nagoya, Japan.

Background
The event was headlined by a Super Lightweight title rematch between the reigning champion Rukiya Anpo and Kaew Fairtex. The event also featured a Women's Flyweight Grand Prix, to crown the new K-1 champion, which included the reigning Krush champion Kana Morimoto, the former Krush title challenger Josefine Lindgren Knutsson, former Krush champion Mellony Geugjes, as well as the Enfusion and ISKA champion Cristina Morales.

The reigning Super Bantamweight champion Yoshiki Takei fought a non-title bout against Suriyanlek OBT.Kamphee, while the Featherweight champion Yuki Egawa met the Super Featherweight champion Takeru Segawa in an exhibition match.

Fight Card

See also
 2019 in Glory 
 2019 in Kunlun Fight
 2019 in ONE Championship
 2019 in Romanian kickboxing
 2019 in Wu Lin Feng

References

External links
Official website

2019 sport-related lists
K-1 events
2019 in kickboxing
2019 in Japanese sport